Fort Lane may refer to:

Fort Lane (Kansas)
Fort Lane (North Carolina), a former U.S. Army post in James City, North Carolina
Fort Lane (Oregon)